James Spooner (born 1976) is an American film director, tattoo artist, and graphic novelist. He is best known for his 2003 documentary film Afro-Punk, and for co-founding the Afropunk Festival. He also directed the 2007 narrative film White Lies, Black Sheep. His first graphic novel, titled The High Desert, was published in 2022.

Early life
James Spooner was born in 1976 in Jersey City, New Jersey. His father is a Saint Lucian professional bodybuilder and former Mr. America and his mother is a retired special education teacher. His parents divorced when he was 8 years old. He grew up in Apple Valley, California and New York City, and attended Apple Valley High School and Fiorello H. LaGuardia High School of Music & Art and Performing Arts. He became fascinated with the punk rock scene in the 8th grade, listening to Sex Pistols, Black Flag, and Misfits.

Career

Music
Spooner is the founder of the record label Kidney Room Records. The label put out three records: Frail's single "Idle Hands Hold Nothing", Elements of Need and Jasmine's split single, and Swing Kids' self-titled single.

He worked as a host at On!, a late-night club event in New York City.

In 2021, he was featured on the Broad's three-part documentary video series, Time Decorated: The Musical Influences of Jean-Michel Basquiat.

Film
Spooner directed the documentary film, Afro-Punk. It premiered at the 2003 Toronto International Film Festival. The film featured black punk fans and musicians talking about music, race, and identity issues. In the DIY tradition, Spooner toured the film across the country like a band, screening it over 300 times at college campuses and film festivals.

The message boards on Afropunk.com became an online community where the users discuss fashion, film, racial identity, and gender politics. After the release of the film, Spooner curated the party series Liberation Sessions, where the film was screened and the bands performed live.

In 2005, Spooner and Matthew Morgan co-founded the Afropunk Festival in Brooklyn. According to The New Yorker, it was "born of necessity, a reprieve from racism in punk spaces and a chance for black punks to build community with one another." The annual festival has grown and been held not only in Brooklyn, but also in Atlanta, London, Paris, and Johannesburg. In 2008, due to philosophical differences with its direction, Spooner ended his involvement with the festival.

He also wrote and directed the narrative film White Lies, Black Sheep. It premiered at the 2007 Toronto International Film Festival.

Writing
Spooner's first graphic novel, titled The High Desert, was published in 2022. The Washington Post included the book in its list of the "10 Best Graphic Novels of 2022". The book also won the 2023 Alex Awards.

Style and influences
In a 2022 interview with Harper's Bazaar, Spooner said: "If there's one song in particular that could really just set the course for my entire life, it's Patti Smith's 'Rock N Roll Nigger'." He added: "If you look at the beginning of my film Afro-Punk, it's dedicated basically to her, without saying her name. When I started the project, I was so angry at punk in general, at the audacious whiteness of my friends, and the song 'Rock N Roll Nigger' encapsulated that audaciousness for me. So I had a pointed anger."

Personal life
Spooner is a vegan. He is also a tattoo artist at Monocle Tattoo, where he pioneered vegan friendly tattooing. He currently lives in Los Angeles with his partner Lisa Nola and daughter.

Filmography

Feature films

Publications

Graphic novels
 The High Desert (2022)

References

External links

 Official website
 

American documentary filmmakers
African-American film directors
American film directors
American graphic novelists
American tattoo artists
American people of Saint Lucian descent
Living people
People from New Jersey
1976 births
21st-century African-American people